The Linden Yard is a CTA rail yard in Wilmette, Illinois which stores cars from the Purple Line of the Chicago Transit Authority. Currently, 5000-series railcars are stored here. It is adjacent to Linden station.

References 

Chicago Transit Authority